Wave Energy Scotland (WES) is a technology development body set up by the Scottish Government to facilitate the development of wave energy in Scotland. It was set up in 2015 and is a subsidiary of Highlands and Islands Enterprise (HIE) based in Inverness. WES manages a number of projects resulting from its pre-commercial procurement funding calls.

Inception 

The Scottish Government took positive action to support the ailing wave energy sector in Scotland, following the demise of one of the leading developers Pelamis Wave Power. The Energy Minister Fergus Ewing announced an initial budget for the body of £14.3 million over 13 months at the RenewableUK conference in February 2015.

Organisation objectives 

The original objectives for WES were set out by the Scottish Government as:

 Seek to retain the intellectual property and know-how from device development in Scotland for future benefit;
 Enable Scotland’s indigenous technologies to reach commercial readiness in the most efficient and effective manner, and in a way that allows the public sector to exit in due course;
 Ensure that the learning gained from support for wave device development and deployment to date, in particular the learning from Scotland’s leading wave technologies, is retained and used to benefit the wave energy industry;
 Avoid duplication in funding, encourage collaboration between companies and research institutes and foster greater standardisation across the industry;
 Ensure value for money from public sector investment; and
 Promote greater confidence in the technical performance of wave energy systems in order to encourage the return of private sector investment.

Project calls 

To date, WES has held four funding calls.

Power Take-off 

A total of 42 applications were made for this £7m call, with contracts awarded to nine consortia.

Novel Wave Energy Converter Call (stage 1) 
Eight projects were funded for the first stage of the Novel Wave Energy Converter call, out of 37 applications.

Structural Materials and Manufacturing Processes Call (stage 1) 
Ten projects were funded from this third Innovation Call

Control Systems 
Thirteen concepts were funded from this fourth Innovation Call.

Stage gate selections

Intellectual property 

WES has acquired intellectual property developed by the now defunct companies Pelamis Wave Power and Aquamarine Power. The former as part of the inception of Wave Energy Scotland, whilst the latter was completed in September 2016.

Annual conference 

The first Wave Energy Scotland annual conference was held on 2 December 2016 at Pollock Halls in Edinburgh This provided an update of ongoing and future calls, plus quick-fire updates from participants ongoing PTO and NWEC calls.

A second annual conference was held on 28 November 2017.

The third annual conference was held on 6 December 2018 at the Edinburgh International Conference Centre.

External links 
 Wave Energy Scotland website

See also 
 Wave power
 Renewable energy in the United Kingdom
 List of wave power projects

References 

Renewable energy organizations
Organisations supported by the Scottish Government
Organisations based in Inverness
Wave power